Walter Drechsel (October 7, 1902 – December 20, 1977) was a German politician of the Free Democratic Party (FDP) and former member of the German Bundestag.

Life 
He was a member of the German Bundestag from 1953 to 1957. In parliament he represented the constituency of Göttingen - Münden.

Literature

References

1902 births
1977 deaths
Members of the Bundestag for Lower Saxony
Members of the Bundestag 1953–1957
Members of the Bundestag for the Free Democratic Party (Germany)